

Campus history 

It is within walking distance of Old Town Pasadena and the Pasadena Playhouse District and therefore the two locations are frequent getaways for Caltech students.

In 1917 Hale hired architect Bertram Goodhue to produce a master plan for the  campus. Goodhue conceived the overall layout of the campus and designed the physics building, Dabney Hall, and several other structures, in which he sought to be consistent with the local climate, the character of the school, and Hale's educational philosophy. Goodhue's designs for Caltech were also influenced by the traditional Spanish mission architecture of Southern California.

During the 1960s, Caltech underwent considerable expansion, in part due to the philanthropy of alumnus Arnold O. Beckman. In 1953, Beckman was asked to join the Caltech Board of Trustees.  In 1964, he became its chairman.  Over the next few years, as Caltech's president emeritus David Baltimore describes it, Arnold Beckman and his wife Mabel "shaped the destiny of Caltech".

The Beckmans made a major gift to Caltech in 1962, when they funded the construction of the Beckman Auditorium, a concert hall designed by architect Edward Durrell Stone.  When the circular white stone hall opened with a gala concert on February 25, 1964, it was praised for its acoustics.

The auditorium was the first of several expansions at Caltech that the Beckmans supported.  In 1974, the Beckman Laboratory of Behavioral Biology (BBB) was dedicated. The building was seen as a significant step towards the establishment of a new program focusing on neurobiology and a multi-leveled understanding of brain and its mechanisms at the chemical, cellular, and systems levels. On April 25, 1986, the Beckman Laboratory of Chemical Synthesis was dedicated. The Beckmans' gift supported not only the building, but also the installation of state-of-the-art scientific instrumentation in six customized  laboratories. Finally, the Beckmans funded the Beckman Institute, a multi-disciplinary center for research in the chemical and biological sciences. In 1986, Beckman agreed to donate $50 million towards the institute and its endowment. Designed by architect Albert C. Martin, Jr. in a Spanish style, the Beckman Institute was dedicated on October 26, 1989, and opened in 1990.

In 1971 a magnitude-6.6 earthquake in San Fernando caused some damage to the Caltech campus. Engineers who evaluated the damage found that two historic buildings dating from the early days of the Institute—Throop Hall and the Goodhue-designed Culbertson Auditorium—had cracked. These were some of the first reinforced concrete buildings, and their plans did not contain enough details (such as how much reinforcing bar had been embedded in the concrete) to be sure they were safe, so the engineers recommended demolition. However, demolishing these historic structures required considerably more effort than would have been necessary had they been in real danger of collapse. A large wrecking ball was used to demolish Throop Hall, and smashing the concrete revealed massive amounts of rebar, far in excess of safety requirements. The rebar had to be cut up before the pieces could be hauled away, and the process took much longer than expected.

New additions to the campus include the Cahill Center for Astronomy and Astrophysics and the Walter and Leonore Annenberg Center for Information Science and Technology, which opened in 2009, and the Warren and Katherine Schlinger Laboratory for Chemistry and Chemical Engineering followed in March 2010. The Institute also concluded an upgrading of the South Houses in 2006. In late 2010, Caltech completed a 1.3 MW solar array projected to produce approximately 1.6 GWh in 2011.

Notable buildings

Athenaeum 
The Athenaeum is a faculty club and private social club on the California Institute of Technology campus in Pasadena, California.  It was designed by Gordon Kaufmann in the Mediterranean Revival style, with landscape design by Florence Yoch and Lucile Council, and opened in 1930.  It includes a restaurant, a private hotel with several named suites (e.g. The Einstein Suite, where Albert Einstein lived while at Caltech), and serves as Caltech's Faculty Club.

Guggenheim Aeronautical Laboratory 

The Guggenheim Aeronautical Laboratory at the California Institute of Technology (GALCIT), was a research institute created in 1926, at first specializing in aeronautics research. In 1930, Hungarian scientist Theodore von Kármán accepted the directorship of the lab and emigrated to the United States. Under his leadership, work on rockets began there in 1936. GALCIT was the first—and from 1936 to 1940 the only—university-based rocket research center.   Based on GALCIT's JATO project at the time, the Jet Propulsion Laboratory was established under a contract with the United States Army in November 1943.

In 1961 the GALCIT acronym was retained while the name changed to Graduate Aeronautical Laboratories at the California Institute of Technology. In 2006, during the Directorship of Ares Rosakis, GALCIT was once again renamed, taking on the new name Graduate Aerospace Laboratories of the California Institute of Technology (while continuing to maintain the acronym GALCIT) in order to reflect its vigorous re-engagement with space engineering and with JPL.

Beckman Institute 

The Beckman Institute at Caltech is a multi-disciplinary center for research in the chemical and biological sciences.  Founding of the Beckman Institute at Caltech was supported by a major philanthropic gift from the Arnold Orville Beckman and his wife Mabel, through the Arnold and Mabel Beckman Foundation. Beckman had a long-term relationship with Caltech as a student, teacher and trustee.  After discussions with chemists Harry B. Gray and Peter Dervan, and biologists Eric H. Davidson and Leroy Hood, Beckman announced in 1986 that he would donate $50 million to establish the institute and an accompanying endowment. The Beckman Institute at Caltech was chartered by Caltech in 1987.

The institute building was designed by architect Albert C. Martin Jr. in a Spanish style with a pool and a central courtyard. It was dedicated on October 26, 1989, and opened in 1990. The building included four levels of laboratory space, libraries, and archives.

List of buildings 
This list includes buildings and facilities of California Institute of Technology.  The listing does not include off-campus/co-owned properties.  Demolished buildings are shown in grey.

References

External links

 Map of Caltech

 01
California Institute of Technology